Dennis Lillee is a former Australian cricketer who took 24 five-wicket hauls during his career in international cricket. A five-wicket haul (also known as a "five–for" or "fifer") refers to a bowler taking five or more wickets in a single innings. This is regarded as a notable achievement, and fewer than 40 bowlers have taken more than 15 five-wicket hauls at international level in their cricketing careers. A fast bowler who represented the Australian cricket team between 1971 and 1984, Lillee was described by one writer as "the heart of Australia['s] bowling attack for more than a decade" and was rated "the outstanding fast bowler of his generation" by the BBC. He was the first bowler to capture 350 Test wickets and held the record for almost two years before Ian Botham surpassed the feat. Lillee was named one of the Wisden Cricketers of the Year in 1973 and the South African Cricket (Annual) Cricketer of the Year three years later. The International Cricket Council (ICC) inducted him into its Cricket Hall of Fame in 2009.

Lillee made his Test debut during the sixth Test of the 1970–71 Ashes series where he claimed a five-wicket haul on debut. He was subsequently selected for the 1972 tour of England and took a pair of five-wicket hauls for the first time in a single match during the final Test of the same series. He ended the series with 31 wickets at an average of 17.67. He went on to claim five-wicket hauls in both innings of a Test match on three more occasions. Lillee's career-best figures for an innings were 7 wickets for 83 runs against the West Indies in 1981. He was most successful against England with eleven five-wicket hauls against them, and was most effective at the Melbourne Cricket Ground, where he took seven of his twenty three five-wicket hauls. When Lillee retired from Test cricket in 1984, he had taken ten or more wickets in a match on seven occasions.

Lillee's One Day International (ODI) debut came against England in 1972. His sole five-wicket haul in ODIs came against Pakistan during the Prudential World Cup (1975) at Headingley. As of 2012, Lillee's combined tally of 24 five-wicket hauls is eleventh in the all-time list, a record jointly held with Sydney Barnes, Imran Khan, Kapil Dev and Dale Steyn.

This list includes only matches that are deemed official by the ICC. Lillee's performances in World Series Cricket and the World XI tour of Australia in 1971–72 are not included.

Key

Tests

One Day Internationals

Notes

References

General

Specific

External links
 Player profile of Dennis Lillee at CricketArchive

Australian cricket lists
Lists of international cricket five-wicket hauls by player